The 1975 Saskatchewan general election was held on June 11, 1975, to elect members of the  Legislative Assembly of Saskatchewan. Blakeney and the NDP were re-elected to a majority government.

Both the New Democratic government of Premier Allan Blakeney and the opposition Liberal Party, led by David Steuart, dropped in support to the resurgent Progressive Conservative Party. The Tories, who were a minor force in the previous election, drew over a quarter of the 1975 electorate.

Campaign 
One of the main issues of the campaign was natural resources management.  On the onset of the campaign, Saskatchewan was facing court challenges and a capital strike from multinational resource extraction companies. The potash industry was opposed to the new provincial reserve tax on the mineral Blakeney's government had introduced the previous year. The federal government under Pierre Trudeau supported the companies' court challenges, and announced in his November 1974 budget that it would end the deduction of provincial royalties from federal tax. 

Under these circumstances, the opposition Liberal and PC parties proposed lower natural resources royalty payments to ease the companies' concerns and bring back investments in the province. They were fiercely opposed to public ownership of natural resources. On the other hand, Blakeney's NDP ran on the slogan New Deal '75. The platform promised to increase royalties, and more direct government participation in the natural resources sector, especially for the development and exploration of energy resources like oil, gas, coal and uranium, and minerals like postash.

Results

Percentages

Ranking

Riding results
Names in bold represent cabinet ministers and the Speaker. Party leaders are italicized. The symbol " ** " indicates MLAs who are not running again.

Northwest Saskatchewan

Northeast Saskatchewan

|-

|style="width: 130px"|Prog. Conservative
|Norm Wipf
|align="right"|3,022
|align="right"|39.84%
|align="right"|+21.37

|NDP
|Jerome Hammersmith
|align="right"|2,773
|align="right"|36.55%
|align="right"|+1.14

|Liberal
|Alexandre Joseph Baribeau
|align="right"|1,791
|align="right"|23.61%
|align="right"|-22.51
|- bgcolor="white"
!align="left" colspan=3|Total
!align="right"|7,586
!align="right"|100.00
!align="right"|

West Central Saskatchewan

East Central Saskatchewan

|-

|style="width: 130px"|NDP
|Norm Lusney
|align="right"|3,724
|align="right"|48.29%
|align="right"|-1.97

|Prog. Conservative
|Barrie Johnson
|align="right"|2,314
|align="right"|30.00%
|align="right"|+13.54

|Liberal
|Donn Walsh
|align="right"|1,674
|align="right"|21.71%
|align="right"|-10.50
|- bgcolor="white"
!align="left" colspan=3|Total
!align="right"|7,712
!align="right"|100.00
!align="right"|

Southwest Saskatchewan

Southeast Saskatchewan

Saskatoon

|-

|style="width: 130px"|Prog. Conservative
|Bill Lane
|align="right"|3,962
|align="right"|38.68%
|align="right"|+18.57

|Liberal
|Gerry Fraser
|align="right"|3,423
|align="right"|33.42%
|align="right"|-10.51

|NDP
|Anne Boulton
|align="right"|2,829
|align="right"|27.61%
|align="right"|-8.35

|Independent
|Alexander Vasey Barker
|align="right"|30
|align="right"|0.29%
|align="right"|
|- bgcolor="white"
!align="left" colspan=3|Total
!align="right"|10,244
!align="right"|100.00
!align="right"|

Regina

See also
List of political parties in Saskatchewan
List of Saskatchewan provincial electoral districts

References

Saskatchewan Archives Board - Election Results By Electoral Division
Elections Saskatchewan: Provincial Vote Summaries

Further reading
 

1975 elections in Canada
1975 in Saskatchewan
1975
June 1975 events in Canada